Geraea viscida is a species of flowering plant in the family Asteraceae known by the common name sticky geraea, or sticky desertsunflower. It is native to southern California, mainly the chaparral hills of eastern San Diego County, and nearby Baja California.

Geraea viscida is a bristly, glandular perennial geophyte producing scrubby stems reaching anywhere from 30 centimeters (12 inches) to nearly a meter (39 inches) in height. The slightly hairy leaves are several centimeters long and generally oval-shaped, sometimes with small teeth and basal lobes. The inflorescence holds one or more flower heads which are knobby clusters of yellow disc florets but no ray florets. The phyllaries surrounding the flower head are particularly sticky. The fruit is an achene up to a centimeter (0.4 inches) long, not including its pappus hairs.

References

External links
Jepson Manual Treatment
United States Department of Agriculture Plants Profile
Calphotos Photo gallery, University of California

Heliantheae
Flora of California
Plants described in 1876
Flora of Baja California
Flora without expected TNC conservation status